Hugh Alton Carter (August 13, 1920 – June 24, 1999) was an American politician and businessman from Georgia. He was also the first cousin of U.S. president Jimmy Carter.

Early life and education
Born in Plains, Georgia, Carter served in World War II as a United States Army lieutenant seeing combat in Europe. After the war, Carter remained in the reserves and retired as a lieutenant colonel in 1964. Carter graduated from Georgia Southwestern State University, when the college was a two-year college and then from the University of Georgia.

Political career
Carter served seven terms (14 years) in the Georgia State Senate, from 1967 until 1981 and was a Democrat.  He represented District 14, and succeeded his cousin future-President Jimmy Carter in that post. He represented eight Georgia rural counties, and served as chairman of the Senate Education Committee and was a senior member of the Appropriations, Rules and Fiscal Affairs Committees.

Business ventures
Carter owned a bait shop and a general (later antique) store. In 1949, Carter started a third business growing fish bait. Originally limited to crickets, he later expanded into worms. By the mid-1950s, Carter was selling worms nationwide and laying claim to the title of "the world's largest worm farmer", producing more than 60 million a year. Carter wrote six pamphlets on worm and cricket farming, the best seller in 1958 was 18 Secrets of Successful Worm Raising  The pamphlet originally sold for $1.00. When Carter raised the price to $2.95 sales grew even faster. In 1978, he wrote a book: Cousin Beedie and Cousin Hot: My life with the Carter Family from Plains, Georgia. The book drew the wrath of aunt Lillian Carter and cousin Billy Carter. In the book, he had referred to the President's mother as "domineering", while offering his opinion of Presidential brother, Billy: "He's not a redneck, but can make money as a redneck". Shortly after the book's publication, Carter drew a political opponent. Peanut farmer Malcolm "Chicken" Wishard, was backed by Hugh Carter's aggrieved aunt Lillian and cousin Billy. However, Wishard's campaign slogan "Help the Chicken take the Worm", failed to inspire voters, and Carter was re-elected to another term in the State Senate.

Later years
Carter retired from the State Senate in 1981. His bait growing business suffered declining sales in the 1990s, and he closed it in 1996. At the age of 78, Hugh Carter died in Americus, Georgia on June 24, 1999.

References

External links

How and Where to Sell Fishworms and Crickets (1957) - Hugh A. Carter
Raising the Gray Cricket (1978) - Hugh A. Carter
How to Raise the African Redworm (1959) - Hugh A. Carter
How to Feed the Hybrid Red Wiggler (1965) - Hugh A. Carter

People from Plains, Georgia
Military personnel from Georgia (U.S. state)
Georgia Southwestern State University alumni
University of Georgia alumni
Businesspeople from Georgia (U.S. state)
Democratic Party Georgia (U.S. state) state senators
Writers from Georgia (U.S. state)
Carter family
1920 births
1999 deaths
20th-century American businesspeople
20th-century American politicians
United States Army personnel of World War II